The Real World: Key West is the seventeenth season of MTV's reality television series The Real World, which focuses on a group of diverse strangers living together for several months in a different city each season, as cameras follow their lives and interpersonal relationships. It is the second season of The Real World to be filmed in the South Atlantic States region of the United States, specifically in Florida after The Real World: Miami.

The season featured seven people and was shot in the Key Haven neighborhood of Key West, Florida from August to December 2005. It premiered on February 28, 2006, and consisted of 25 episodes. The season premiere was viewed by 3.33 million people.

In 2019, the season was made available for streaming on Facebook Watch (alongside the sixteenth and twenty-eighth seasons) ahead of The Real World: Atlantas premiere.

Production
The production faced a lawsuit by tourism mogul Ed Swift, a neighbor to the Driftwood Drive house, who sought to stop filming at the location, on the grounds that the production's floodlights, commercial-sized air conditioners, and outdoor cameras capable of rotating towards his house were a nuisance, and that local zoning laws prohibit commercial use of Key Haven homes. After MTV threatened to cancel production in response to the lawsuit, a judge threw out the lawsuit and allowed Bunim-Murray Productions to continue filming the season, with some minor production restrictions put in place.

During filming, Hurricane Rita made landfall, forcing the cast to evacuate to West Palm Beach. Subsequently, Wilma hit the area, forcing them to evacuate again, first to Ft. Lauderdale, and then to Orlando.

Assignment
Almost every season of The Real World, beginning with its fifth season, has included the assignment of a season-long group job or task to the housemates, continued participation in which has been mandatory to remain part of the cast since the Back to New York season. The Key West cast was assigned to assist in starting a Mystic Tan franchise at the Pineapple Gallery. It closed briefly after Hurricane Wilma had devastated the store, and later reopened.

The residence
The cast lived in a nearly  Spanish Mediterranean-style, five bedroom, four and a half bathroom house at 32 Driftwood Drive in Key Haven, just north of the Key West city limits. The property spans  of waterfront property, and includes a tennis court, indoor racquetball court, gym, and an open dock. The house, which, along with two adjacent lots, was leased from June 28 to December 30, 2005, also included a  x  indoor pool that was converted into a sunken lounge area for filming. The house also included an outdoor pool. The house sustained some damage from Hurricane Wilma.

Cast

: Age at the time of filming.

Episodes

After filming
After the cast left the Real World house, all seven of them appeared to discuss their experiences both during and since their time on the show, Fun, Sun, and Now Totally Done: The Real World Key West Reunion which premiered on August 22, 2006, and was hosted by Susie Castillo.

At the 2008 The Real World Awards Bash, Svetlana won the title of "Hottest Female" and Johnny was named "Hottest Male". Other nominees included Paula for "Best Meltdown" and for "Best Phonecall Gone Bad", and Tyler for "Roommate you Love to Hate", "Best Dance-Off" and for "Steamiest Scene" alongside Bhakti.

In 2006, Paula Meronek was arrested for assault for allegedly biting then-boyfriend John Alyward. In April, 2014, she married Jack Beckert and gave birth to three babies: Atlas (born in 2014), Athena Rose (born in 2015) and Aurora Mae (born in 2019).<ref name="generation">{{cite web|title='REAL WORLDS NEXT GENERATION: SEE THE FORMER CAST MEMBERS' CAMERA-READY KIDS|url=http://www.mtv.com/news/2065104/real-world-castmembers-kids/|author=Jordana Ossad|website=MTV|date=February 2, 2015|access-date=May 13, 2019}}</ref>

Svetlana Shusterman became an aspiring actress and model who appeared in FHM as one of the "Girls of FHM". In 2007 she was arrested for disorderly conduct.Svetlana Shusterman at Girls of FHM In March 2014, Shusterman filed a restraining order against Incubus frontman Brandon Boyd. Boyd responded that he did not know her, and did not recall having ever met her.

Janelle Casanave got married on June 13, 2015.

In 2011, Devenanzio alleged in a lawsuit that the TV series Entourage damaged his name and personality and caused him emotional distress by featuring a character named "Johnny Bananas", played by Kevin Dillon. One year later, the judge ruled in HBO's favor. In 2017, he appeared on Fear Factor alongside Leroy Garrett from The Real World: Las Vegas. In 2018, he started hosting 1st Look, a late-night travel series on NBC. In 2020, Devenanzio competed in season 19 of Worst Cooks in America. Devenanzio subsequently hosted another late-night NBC show, Celebrity Sleepover, which premiered on April 3, 2021.

The Challenge

Challenge in bold indicates that the contestant was a finalist on the Challenge.

Note: Paula appeared on the 2010 MTV special Spring Break Challenge'' as a color commentator.

References

External links
 MTV's The Real World: Key West official site
House rental lease for Real World Key West
Svetlana Shusterman's blog

Key West
Television shows set in Florida
2006 American television seasons
Key West, Florida
Television shows filmed in Florida